Abbas Zaki is the former representative of the Palestine Liberation Organization (PLO) in Lebanon and a member of Fatah's central committee.

As a result of the conflict in the Nahr al-Bared Camp in Lebanon, Zaki proposed setting up a Palestinian security force of 4,000 to 5,000 members in the refugee camps in Lebanon to prevent the formation of extremist groups.

Zaki described Fatah al-Islam as "an ignorant group, hiding themselves behind Islam, and practicing the most ugly crimes against women and children in the camp of Nahr al Barid." In May 2009, Zaki suggested that if unity talks between Hamas and Fatah in Cairo fail, Abbas should form a new government that will lay out a new approach to Hamas.

Ahead of Fatah's sixth conference on August 4, 2009, Zaki stated "I'm sorry to compare, but the Israelis elected Lieberman and appointed him as Foreign Minister, and a similar mistake was made by the Palestinian people in electing Hamas, which is setting up all the obstacles preventing the improvement of the national unity."

In response to United States president Barack Obama's U.N. Speech on Palestinian Statehood on September 23, 2011, Zaki called Obama and Benjamin Netanyahu "trash", and said "The greater goal cannot be accomplished in one go.... If Israel withdraws from Jerusalem, evacuates the 650,000 settlers, and dismantles the wall – what will become of Israel? It will come to an end."

In a statement which aired on the official Palestinian Authority TV channel on March 12, 2014 (as translated by MEMRI), Zaki stated "Those Israelis have no religion and no principles. They are nothing but advanced tools for evil. They talk about the Holocaust and so on. So why are they doing this to us? Therefore, in my view, Allah will gather them so that we can kill them. Every killer is bound to be killed. There is no other option."

References

Living people
Fatah members
1942 births
People from Hebron Governorate
Mandatory Palestine people
Palestinian politicians
Palestine Liberation Organization members
Central Committee of Fatah members
Ambassadors of the State of Palestine to Lebanon